Blair Witch is a 2016 found footage supernatural horror film directed by Adam Wingard and written by Simon Barrett. It is the third film in the Blair Witch series and a direct sequel to the 1999 film The Blair Witch Project, while ignoring the events of its 2000 follow-up film Book of Shadows: Blair Witch 2, given the events of that film being a film within a film. It stars James Allen McCune, Callie Hernandez, Brandon Scott, Corbin Reid, Valorie Curry, and Wes Robinson. The film follows a group of college students and their local guides who venture into the Black Hills Forest in Maryland to uncover the mysteries surrounding the prior disappearance of Heather Donahue, the sister of one of the characters.

Development of the film began in September 2009, when creators of the franchise Daniel Myrick and Eduardo Sánchez announced their intent to produce a third Blair Witch film. The film was a sequel to the first film, would potentially contain the actors from the first film in some context, and would not refer to any of the events from Book of Shadows. In 2011, Sánchez remarked that further development on a sequel depended on getting Lionsgate Films to approve the idea and for his and Myrick's schedule to match up. The film went into development hell, and later the script was thrown aside. In 2013, a third Blair Witch film was again in talks, with Wingard and Barrett being hired to work on a new script. Initially, the film's connection to the Blair Witch franchise was kept secret, with the film having been shot under the fake title The Woods. The film's true title was revealed at the 2016 San Diego Comic-Con International.

Blair Witch premiered at San Diego Comic-Con on July 22, 2016, and was screened at the Toronto International Film Festival on September 11, before being theatrically released on September 16, by Lionsgate Films. It received mixed reviews, with critics noting it as an improvement on Book of Shadows although criticized the writing and special effects. While the film grossed $45 million against a budget of $5 million, it was considered a box office disappointment, given that the original film had grossed nearly $250 million in 1999 against a budget of $60,000.

Plot

In 2014, James Donahue finds a video on YouTube containing an image of a woman he believes to be his sister Heather, who disappeared in 1994 near Burkittsville, Maryland while investigating the legend of the Blair Witch. He decides to travel to the woods to find out the truth, accompanied by his friend Peter Jones, Peter's girlfriend Ashley Bennett, and film student Lisa Arlington, who wants to film James' search as a documentary, The Absence of Closure. Locals Talia and Lane, who found and uploaded the video, say they will show the group the location that they found the tape, on the condition they can join them.

While walking through the woods and upon setting up camp for the night, Lane and Talia discuss the disappearance of Heather and her film crew, the 1940-41 murders by Rustin Parr, and other mysterious occurrences, which they ascribe to the Blair Witch. Specifically, Lane explains that the witch was not just left tied to a tree to die, instead tied high up in the tree with weights on her arms and legs to act as a makeshift torture rack.

The group hear noises during the night, then awaken at 2 p.m. to find strange stick figures hanging from the trees. When Lisa notices twine in Lane's backpack, he and Talia admit to creating the figures in order to convince the group to believe, but also point out that there is no explanation for the strange noises during the night and sleeping through the day. James and his associates banish Lane and Talia from the group and head out of the woods.

After hours of walking, the four arrive back at their original campsite. Lisa pilots a drone to obtain their location, but from its vantage point they can see no way out of the forest. Ashley becomes sick due to a wound on her foot, forcing the group to camp again. When Peter inspects Ashley's wounded foot, he notices what he thinks may be a parasite inside the wound. Peter leaves the camp for firewood, and is chased by an unknown entity. A tree falls on him and his body then disappears.

Lane and Talia appear in the night, claiming they have been wandering for five days without a sunrise. Lane believes the camp is a hallucination and runs off, leaving the disheveled and ravenously hungry Talia. The next morning, James and Lisa find that it is still dark outside at 7am and discover larger stick figures. Talia sees clumps of her hair tied to one of the figures. Ashley accuses Talia of crafting them and snaps the figure with Talia's hair in half; Talia herself is then snapped in half. An unseen force lifts their tent into the sky and the group is separated.

Ashley finds the drone and climbs a tree to recover it, but is knocked out and falls from the tree, an unknown entity dragging her away. A rainstorm ensues as Lisa and James stumble across Rustin Parr's house, which James had previously stated to have been burned down after Parr's execution. James hears someone he thinks is Heather scream upstairs, enters the house without Heather, and sees Peter standing in a corner. He chases after the figure he believes to be Heather, a teleporting disheveled figure; upon its vanishing he barricades himself.

Lisa spots a tall, pale, long-limbed creature moving through the trees, and she runs inside the house. She enters the basement where she finds a hostile Lane who traps her in a tunnel, saying, "You have to do what she tells you." She escapes the tunnel, and stabs and kills Lane on the other side. The long-limbed creature emerges from the tunnel and chases Lisa. She runs up to the attic with Lane's camcorder, passing a mirror that shows Heather, revealing that the tape found by Lane is actually the one being recorded by Lisa, creating the paradox video that lured them all to the woods.

She reunites with James in the attic and they try to barricade the door. A bright light shines from outside the building. James tells Lisa to face the corner of the room and desperately apologizes to her before something enters the room. James is tricked into turning around, believing that he hears Heather's voice, and vanishes from sight. Lisa realizes she will die if she turns around so she uses Lane's camcorder to view what is behind her and begins walking backward. She thinks she hears James' voice and turns to look whereupon she is snatched away. Her camera falls to the ground. After a few moments, the camera gives out.

Cast
 James Allen McCune as James Donahue 
 Callie Hernandez as Lisa Arlington
 Brandon Scott as Peter
 Corbin Reid as Ashley Bennett
 Valorie Curry as Talia
 Wes Robinson as Lane

Production

Development
While promoting V/H/S/2 (2013) at the Sundance Film Festival, director Adam Wingard and writer Simon Barrett ran into original The Blair Witch Project (1999) co-filmmaker Eduardo Sánchez and producer Gregg Hale, and asked them why there were not any more Blair Witch films. Although nothing came of the meeting at the time, a few months later, Wingard and Barrett were asked to meet with Lionsgate Films to potentially work on a secret project. Barrett recalled that, in the initial pitch meeting, Lionsgate had already crafted a story for a new Blair Witch film, and simply asked if they would be interested in making it. Barrett said that the "only thing I really pitched was the other characters; they'd originally conceived the film as more similar to the first film, following its narrative fairly closely, with only three or four characters, I think, but I wanted more characters to give us more scare sequences. I also wanted a unique dynamic within the group from the start, so I pitched the idea of introducing some Burkittsville locals to the group."

Barrett would later note that the team found the found footage genre more challenging, as they have only previously worked with it on the anthology V/H/S films. Barrett noted that with the V/H/S series, there was an inherent entertainment value, where the segments "were never meant to feel entirely real", an element that did not work for the Blair Witch series. Speaking on the issue to Bloody Disgusting, Barrett said that "even if our scares didn't work in V/H/S, hopefully people would still be entertained, and if they weren't, well, another short would start in a few minutes"; he added that if a scare did not work in Blair Witch, "we'd have nothing to fall back on, we’d just have failed completely, and publicly". To prevent this from happening, Barrett and Winger extensively went over each "scare" to discover why it was scary and how the audience would react to it. For some sequences, multiple approaches were tried differently, "to give us options in the editing room".

Filming
Principal photography took place in the spring of 2015, in a set of woods in British Columbia in Canada. Scenes taking place in the famous Blair Witch House were shot in a sound stage where the House was entirely rebuilt.

Connections to The Blair Witch Project
Prior to the film's premiere at the 2016 San Diego Comic-Con International, the fact that the film was a Blair Witch sequel remained a closely guarded secret, as the film was shot under the title The Woods. According to the film's writer, Barrett, the film's secrecy was done to prevent backlash among Internet commenters, who the filmmakers felt would react negatively to news of a reboot.

Prior to the official premiere, Lionsgate went as far as to release a trailer for the film incorporating actual footage, while still keeping the film's lineage a secret.  The film was still publicly known as The Woods even at Comic-Con, prior to its first screening, with io9 reporting that the initial theater for the screening was filled with posters for the fake film. After the screening (during which audiences realized that the film was a sequel), all the promotional material in the theater was changed to reflect the film's actual title.

Release
Blair Witch premiered at San Diego Comic-Con on July 22, 2016, and was screened at the Toronto International Film Festival on September 11, before being theatrically released on September 16, by Lionsgate Films

Reception

Box office
Blair Witch grossed $20.8 million in North America and $24.4 million in other territories, for a worldwide total of $45.2 million, against a production budget of $5 million.

In the United States and Canada, the film was released on September 16, 2016, and was initially projected to gross at least $20 million with a chance to get as high as $26 million in its opening weekend, from 3,121 theaters. Lionsgate's expectations were more conservative, however, with a projected $15–18 million opening, although rival studios were predicting significantly higher numbers, noting how horror films saw solid performances throughout 2016, including Lights Out, The Conjuring 2, The Purge: Election Year, The Shallows and Don't Breathe. However, after grossing $765,000 from its Thursday previews and $4.1 million on its first day, opening projections were lowered to $10 million. It ended up grossing $9.7 million in its opening weekend, below expectations and the lowest opening weekend of the series. The film was considered a box office disappointment by analysts.

The film received a day-and-date release in many countries in conjunction with its North American debut.

The film cost $5 million to produce, with an additional $20 million spent on promotion, advertising and marketing costs.

Critical response
Blair Witch received mixed reviews, with critics noting it as an improvement on Book of Shadows while criticizing the writing and special effects. On Rotten Tomatoes, the film has an approval rating of 37% based on 225 reviews, with an average rating of 5.30/10. The site's critical consensus reads, "Blair Witch doles out a handful of effective scares, but aside from a few new twists, it mainly offers a belated rehash of the original – and far more memorable – first film". On Metacritic, the film has a weighted average score of 47 out of 100, based on 41 critics. Audiences polled by CinemaScore gave the film an average grade of "D+" on an A+ to F scale.  According to Entertainment Weeklys Joey Nolfi, while Blair Witch is generally regarded as an improvement over Book of Shadows: Blair Witch 2, "moviegoers and film journalists essentially told [Blair Witch] to stand in the corner...critical reviews and audience exit polling...are still some of the worst of any 2016 release thus far".

Michael Roffman of Consequence of Sound wrote that "nothing [about the film] is scary, nothing is remotely disturbing, and there's this boring familiarity to the proceedings, namely because it's more or less a beat-by-beat remake of the original". The Hollywood Reporter'''s Leslie Felperin criticized the film, commenting that it is "a dull retread rather than a full-on reinvention", enlarging the cast numbers this time but sticking to the same basic beats. Scott Tobias of GQ felt that the makers of Blair Witch made a poor decision by making the film less subtle than the original. Thomas Simpson of the Rock River Times said that the film "lacks any real scares" and that, after watching it, "you shouldn’t have any issues turning the light off at night". The New York Posts Kyle Smith condemned the film by saying that "the take-away from Blair Witch is not terror, but sorrow" and gave it 1.5 stars out of 4.

Josh Kurp of Uproxx gave the film a mixed review, saying "Blair Witch is scary, but it lacks surprise, and without surprise, you're left with a bunch of kind-of annoying people shakily filming themselves wandering the woods and reacting to loud noises". Mark Kermode gave the film three out of five stars in a review for The Guardian, calling it efficient but unadventurous. Vanity Fairs Jordan Hoffman felt that the film was inferior to You're Next, a previous film by Wingard and writer Simon Barrett, and said that Blair Witchs "jump-scares [will] make for a fun night at the movies, but it's like chomping on White Castle hamburgers—when this creative team has previously served us a prime rib".

Conversely, IGN reviewer Chris Tilly declared that Blair Witch is "so good it'll make you forget that Book of Shadows ever happened". Mark Eccleston of Glamour'' wrote that the film has "genuine, jarring scares...and an unsettling late surprise that makes it well worth popping to you nearest multiplex to have the holy crap scared out of you". Bloody Disgusting's Brad Miska was positive to the film and gave it a 4.5 out of 5 rating, and included it in his list of the "Best Horror Films of 2016".

Soundtrack

The soundtrack was released on September 16, 2016 via Lakeshore Records, concurrent with the film's release. The score was composed by director Wingard and produced by electronic music producer Robert Rich.

 "Black Hills Forest"
 "Rustin Parr"
 "Camp Fire"
 "Panic Attack"
 "Blair Witch"
 "Lane and Talia"
 "The Project"
 "Invocation of Evil"
 "No Trespassing"
 "The House in the Woods"

Additional music
 "Hakmarrja" – N.K.V.D   
 "Pagan Dance Move" – Arnaud Rebotini
 "Rien à Paris" – Liz & László

Future
In April 2022, Lionsgate announced a new film as a reboot of the series to be in development.

See also
 List of films featuring drones

Notes

References

External links
 
 
 
 
 

2010s psychological horror films
2016 films
2016 horror films
American psychological horror films
American sequel films
American supernatural horror films
American body horror films
American mystery horror films
Alternative sequel films
3
Camcorder films
Drone films
2010s English-language films
Films about death
Films about film directors and producers
Films directed by Adam Wingard
Films set in 2014
Films set in forests
Films set in Maryland
Lionsgate films
Films about witchcraft
Films produced by Roy Lee
Films produced by Keith Calder
Films with screenplays by Simon Barrett (filmmaker)
Films scored by Adam Wingard
Vertigo Entertainment films
2010s American films